Sandra Borderieux (born 30 January 1979) is a French-Spanish judoka.

Achievements

References

1979 births
Living people
Spanish people of French descent
French female judoka
Spanish female judoka
Mediterranean Games silver medalists for France
Mediterranean Games medalists in judo
Competitors at the 2001 Mediterranean Games
Competitors at the 2005 Mediterranean Games